Mort Dixon (March 20, 1892 – March 23, 1956) was an American lyricist.

Biography
Born in New York City, United States, Dixon began writing songs in the early 1920s, and was active into the 1930s. He achieved success with his first published effort, 1923's "That Old Gang of Mine". His chief composer collaborators were Ray Henderson, Harry Warren, Harry M. Woods and Allie Wrubel.

His composing output declined in the late 1930s, and he retired early in life to reside in Westchester County, New York.

Among his lyrics are:
"That Old Gang Of Mine" (1923), "Bye Bye Blackbird" (1926), "I'm Looking Over a Four Leaf Clover" (1927), "Nagasaki" (1928), "Would You Like to Take a Walk?" (1930), "I Found a Million Dollar Baby (in a Five and Ten Cent Store)", "You're My Everything", and "River, Stay 'Way from My Door" (1931), "Flirtation Walk" and "Mr and Mrs is the Name" (1934) and "The Lady in Red" (1935).

Dixon is a member of the Songwriters Hall of Fame. He died in Bronxville, New York.

References

External links

Mort Dixon at the Songwriters Hall of Fame
 Mort Dixon recordings at the Discography of American Historical Recordings.

1892 births
1956 deaths
American lyricists